Lawrence McAdory (born June 21, 1929) is an American politician who served in the Alabama House of Representatives from the 56th district from 1994 to 1998 and from 2009 to 2014.

References

1929 births
Living people
Democratic Party members of the Alabama House of Representatives